YTS may refer to:

 Yamagata Television System, a television station in Yamagata Prefecture, Japan
 Youth Training Scheme, a United Kingdom on-the-job training scheme
 Timmins/Victor M. Power Airport (IATA code YTS)
 web domain of YIFY Torrents from 2014 onwards
 several  models of Yamaha tenor saxophones
 several tugboats in the Royal Canadian Navy